Clovis points are the characteristically fluted projectile points associated with the New World Clovis culture, a prehistoric Paleo-American culture. They are present in dense concentrations across much of North America and they are largely restricted to the north of South America. There are slight differences in points found in the Eastern United States bringing them to sometimes be called "Clovis-like". Clovis points date to the Early Paleoindian period, with all known points dating from roughly 13,400–12,700 years ago (11,500 to 10,800 C14 years BP). As an example, Clovis remains at the Murry Springs Site date to  around 12,900 calendar years ago (10,900 ± 50 C14 years BP). Clovis fluted points are named after the city of Clovis, New Mexico, where examples were first found in 1929 by Ridgely Whiteman.

Sides are parallel to convex, and exhibit careful pressure flaking along the blade edge. The broadest area is towards the base which is distinctly concave with a concave grooves called "flutes" removed from one or, more commonly, both surfaces of the blade. The lower edges of the blade and base are ground to dull edges for hafting.

Around 10,000 years before present, a new type of fluted projectile point called Folsom appeared in archaeological deposits, and Clovis-style points disappeared from the continental United States. Most Folsom points are shorter in length than Clovis points and exhibit longer flutes and different pressure flaking patterns. This is particularly easy to see when comparing the unfinished preforms of Clovis and Folsom points.

Type Description 

Only a few recovered Clovis points are in their original condition. Most points were "reworked" to resharpen them or repair damage. This can make it difficult to identify which lithic tradition they come from.

Clovis type description:
Clovis is a comparatively large and heavy bifacially flaked fluted lanceolate point, lenticular to near oval in cross-section with parallel to moderately convex lateral edges, a majority having the latter. 
Maximum width is usually at or slightly below midpoint, frequently resulting in rather long sharp tips. 
Bases are normally only slightly concave, the depth usually ranging from 1 mm to 4 mm and arching completely across basal width. 
Basal corners range from nearly square to slightly rounded without forming eared projections. 
Length range is considerable, with a majority between 75 mm and 110 mm.
Maximum width range is 25 mm to 50 mm, a majority near the former. 
Maximum thickness range, 5 mm to 10 mm.
Normally fluted on both faces.
Flutes are most often produced by multiple flake removals
Length and quality of flutes is greatly variable, with length usually 30% to 50% of overall point length, and the majority near the former
Base of flutes is often widened by subsequent removals of additional channel flakes or short wide flakes. 
There is minimal post-fluting retouch of basal areas. 
Overall flaking frequently irregular in both size and orientation, often including large facet remnants of early stage reduction processes
There is very moderate evidence of pressure flaking
Lower lateral and basal edges are smoothed by grinding, often resulting in slight tapering of base.
Clovis points do not have recurved (fishtail) lateral edges, or pronounced basal constrictions. *Neither do they have convex (Folsom-type) channel flake platform remnants

Specimens are known to have been made of flint, chert, jasper, chalcedony and other stone of conchoidal fracture.

Distribution 

Clovis points have been found over most of North America and, less commonly, as far south as Venezuela. Of the around 6000 points currently classified as Clovis found in the United States the majority were east of the Mississippi and especially in the Southeast. Some researchers suggest that many of the eastern points are misclassified and most real Clovis Points are found in the west. Significant Clovis find sites include:

Anzick site in Montana
Aubrey site in Texas
Big Eddy Site in Missouri
Blackwater Draw type site in New Mexico
Colby site in Wyoming
Dent site in Colorado
Domebo Canyon in Oklahoma
East Wenatchee Clovis Site in Washington
El Fin del Mundo in Sonora, Mexico
Gault site in Texas
Lange-Ferguson in Florida
Lehner Mammoth-Kill Site in Arizona
Murray Springs Clovis Site in Arizona
Naco Mammoth Kill Site in Arizona
Paleo Crossing site in Ohio
Ready site (aka LIncoln Hills site) in Illinois
Shawnee-Minisink Site in Pennsylvania
Simon site in Idaho
Sloth Hole in Florida

Fraudulent Clovis points have also emerged on the open market, some with false documentation.

Caches
Clovis points, along with other stone and bone/ivory tools, have been identified in over two dozen artifact caches. These caches range from the Mississippi River to the Rocky Mountains and Northwest United States. While the Anzick cache is associated with a child burial, the majority of caches appear to represent anticipatory material storage at strategic locations on the Pleistocene landscape. In May 2008, a major Clovis cache, now called the Mahaffey Cache, was found in Boulder, Colorado, with 83 Clovis stone tools though no actual Clovis Points. The tools were found to have traces of horse and cameloid protein. They were dated to 13,000 to 13,500 YBP, a date confirmed by sediment layers in which the tools were found and the types of protein residues found on the artifacts. The Fenn cache, which came to light in private hands in 1989 and whose place of discovery is unknown.

Origins

Whether Clovis toolmaking technology was developed in the Americas in response to megafauna hunting or originated through influences from elsewhere is a open question among archaeologists. Lithic antecedents of Clovis points have not been found in northeast Asia, from where the first human inhabitants of the Americas originated in the current consensus of archaeology. Some archaeologists have argued that similarities between points produced by the Solutrean culture in the Iberian peninsula of Europe suggest that the technology was introduced by hunters traversing the Atlantic ice-shelf and suggests that some of the first American humans were European (the Solutrean hypothesis). However, this hypothesis is not well-accepted as other archaeologists have pointed out that Solutrean and Clovis lithic technologies are technologically distinct (e.g. a lack of distinctive flutes in Solutrean technology), there is no genetic evidence for European ancestry in Indigenous North Americans, and the proposed Solutrean migration route was likely unsuitable.

See also
Barnes projectile point
Beaver Lake point
Cascade point
Cumberland point
Eden point
Golondrina point
Goshen point
Plainview point
Plano point
Simpson point
Suwannee point

References

Further reading
Collins, Michael B., "Clovis Blade Technology", University of Texas Press, Austin, 1999
Rémy Crassard et al., "Fluted-point technology in Neolithic Arabia: An independent invention far from the Americas", Plos One, August 5, 2020 https://doi.org/10.1371/journal.pone.0236314
Di Peso, Charles C., "Clovis Fluted Points from Southeastern Arizona", American Antiquity 19, pp. 82-85, 1953
Frison, George C., "Experimental Use of Clovis Weaponry and Tools on African Elephants", American Antiquity, vol. 54, no. 4, pp. 766–84. 1989
Greene, F. E., "The Clovis Blades: An Important Addition to the Llano Complex", American Antiquity 29, pp. 145-165, 1963
HAYNES, C. VANCE, "DISTRIBUTION OF CLOVIS POINTS IN ARIZONA AND THE CLOVIS EXPLORATION OF THE STATE, 11,000 B.C.", Kiva, vol. 76, no. 3, pp. 343–67, 2011
Hesse, India S., "A Reworked Clovis Point near Chevelon Ruin, Arizona", Kiva, vol. 61, no. 1, pp. 83–88, 1995
Holen, Steven R., "Clovis Projectile Points and Preforms in Nebraska: Distribution and Lithic Sources", Current Research in the Pleistocene 20, pp. 31-33, 2003
Eren, Metin I., et al., "North American Clovis Point Form and Performance IV: An Experimental Assessment of Knife Edge Effectiveness and Wear", Lithic Technology, pp. 1-12, 2013
Morrow, Juliet E., "CLOVIS PROJECTILE POINT MANUFACTURE: A PERSPECTIVE FROM THE READY/LINCOLN HILLS SITE, 11JY46, JERSEY COUNTY, ILLINOIS", Midcontinental Journal of Archaeology, vol. 20, no. 2, pp. 167–91, 1995
Peck, Rodney M., "Clovis Points of Early Man in North Carolina", The Piedmont Journal of Archaeology 6, pp. 1-22, 1988
Peck, Rodney M., "UNIQUE FEATURES OF AN UNUSUAL LARGE NORTH CAROLINA CLOVIS POINT", Central States Archaeological Journal, vol. 51, no. 4, 2004
Prasciunas, Mary M., "MAPPING CLOVIS: PROJECTILE POINTS, BEHAVIOR, AND BIAS", American Antiquity, vol. 76, no. 1, pp. 107–26, 2011

External links 
 The Paleoindian Database of the Americas
 Clovis Points at the site in Gault, Texas
 Virginia Department of Historic Resources
 Clovis Point at the British Museum
 Quartz Crystal Clovis Point at the University of Arkansas
 Clovis points found in Maryland

Projectile points
Archaeological artefact types
Primitive technology
Clovis culture
Indigenous weapons of the Americas